Carl Thomas Rowan (August 11, 1925 – September 23, 2000) was a prominent American journalist, author and government official who published columns syndicated across the U.S. and was at one point the highest ranking African American in the United States government.

Life and career
Carl Rowan was born in Ravenscroft, Tennessee, the son of Johnnie, a cook and cleaner, and Thomas Rowan, who stacked lumber. He was raised in McMinnville, Tennessee, during the Great Depression. Rowan was determined to get a good education. He graduated from Bernard High School in 1942 as class president and valedictorian. After graduating from high school, Rowan worked cleaning porches at a tuberculosis hospital in order to attend Tennessee State College in Nashville. He studied at Tennessee State University (1942–43) and Washburn University (1943–44). He was one of the first African Americans to serve as a commissioned officer in the United States Navy. Rowan was also a member of Omega Psi Phi fraternity. He was graduated from Oberlin College (1947) and was awarded a master's degree in journalism from the University of Minnesota (1948). He began his career in journalism writing for the African-American newspapers Minneapolis Spokesman and St. Paul Recorder (now the Minnesota Spokesman-Recorder). He went on to be a copywriter for The Minneapolis Tribune (1948–50), and later became a staff writer (1950–61), reporting extensively on the Civil Rights Movement.

In 1960, Rowan was denied membership to a club on the grounds that it was racially segregated; this subsequently inspired Joe Glazer to write the song "I Belong to a Private Club".

In a 1964 interview with Robert Penn Warren for the book Who Speaks for the Negro?, Rowan reflected on his reporting of the civil rights movement, as well as his opinions on the distinctions between the North and the South, prejudices and persecution, and African Americans' political power.

In 1961, Rowan was appointed Deputy Assistant Secretary of State by President John F. Kennedy. The following year, he served as a delegate to the United Nations during the Cuban Missile Crisis. Rowan became the U.S. Ambassador to Finland in 1963. In 1964, Rowan was appointed director of the United States Information Agency (USIA) by President Lyndon B. Johnson. In serving as director of the USIA, Rowan became the first African American to hold a seat on the National Security Council and the highest level African American in the United States government.

From 1966 to 1998, Rowan wrote a syndicated column for the Chicago Sun-Times and, from 1967 to 1996, was a panelist on a television program Agronsky & Company, later called Inside Washington; Rowan was a fair opponent whose arguments were persuasive and well-balanced - he always came across as the voice of reason.

His name appeared on the master list of Nixon political opponents. Rowan was a 1995 Pulitzer Prize finalist for his commentaries. He is the only journalist in history to win the Sigma Delta Chi medallion for journalistic excellence in three successive years.

Carl Rowan was a well known and highly decorated journalist. His columns were published in more than one hundred newspapers across the United States. In 1968 he received the Elijah Parish Lovejoy Award as well as an honorary Doctor of Laws degree from Colby College. In 1997, he was awarded the Spingarn Medal from the NAACP.

Thurgood Marshall's only interview while serving on the Supreme Court of the United States was for Carl Rowan's 1988 documentary. The National Press Club gave Rowan its 1999 Fourth Estate Award for lifetime achievement. On January 9, 2001, United States Secretary of State Madeleine Albright dedicated the press briefing room at the State Department as the Carl T. Rowan Briefing room.

Rowan died in Washington on Sept. 23, 2000, of heart and kidney ailments in the intensive care unit at Washington Hospital Center. Rowan was 75 and had diabetes prior to his death.

Rowan was survived by his wife, Vivien, and the three children they shared: two sons and one daughter. Rowan’s two sons are Carl Jr., a lawyer; and Jeffrey, a clinical psychologist. His daughter, Barbara Rowan Jones, is a formal journalist like her father. Carl Rowan also is survived by four grandchildren.

Montgomery bus boycott
In the late 1950s, Rowan covered the burgeoning civil rights movement in the South, including the 1955 Montgomery bus boycott in Alabama, resulting from Rosa Parks's refusal to relinquish her bus seat to a white passenger. As the only black reporter covering the story for a national newspaper, Rowan struck a special friendship with the boycott's leaders, including Martin Luther King Jr. When news of an unlikely compromise settlement of the boycott came to Rowan's attention across the Associated Press wire, he notified King, who made quick steps to discredit the story, which was about to appear in a Montgomery newspaper, thus ensuring the continuance of the boycott.

Project Excellence
Founded in 1987 by Rowan, Project Excellence was a college scholarship program for black high-school seniors who displayed outstanding writing and speaking skills. Rowan founded Project Excellence to combat negative peer pressure felt by black students and to reward students who rose above stereotypes and negative peer influence and excelled academically. Chaired by Rowan, a committee of journalists, community leaders, and school officials oversaw the program. Participants were African-American students in their senior year of high school from public, private, and parochial schools in the metropolitan Washington area, including the Virginia and Maryland suburbs. By 2000 the program had given out $26 million in scholarship money to over 1150 students.

Shooting controversy
Rowan gained public notoriety on June 14, 1988, when he shot an unarmed teenage trespasser, Ben Smith. "The interloper was a near-naked teenager who had been skinny-dipping with friends in Rowan's pool, and the columnist's weapon was an unregistered, and thus illegal, .22 caliber pistol."

From People magazine: "When Rowan heard the police arrive, he stepped outside to let them in. It was then, he says, that he was confronted by "a tall man who was smoking something that I absolutely was sure was marijuana." Rowan says he repeatedly warned the intruder that he was armed and would shoot. "My first words were: 'Freeze! Stay where you are!' " says Rowan. "Then I said, 'I have a gun.' " Rowan says the man kept coming and that he finally felt forced to shoot in self-defense. He says he aimed at the intruder's feet but hit him in the wrist when the man lunged forward.

The intruder, Chevy Chase, Maryland, teenager Benjamin Smith, 18, tells a different story. "I was in my underwear," he told a radio interviewer. "I just climbed out of the pool. It was pretty innocent. I never spoke with him. He just shot me and closed the door and went back hiding in his house. I mean, I guess I was trespassing. But that's no reason to shoot a person, is it? For swimming in their pool?"

Rowan was charged for firing a gun that he did not legally own. Rowan was arrested and tried. During the trial, he argued that he had the right to use whatever means necessary to protect himself and his family. He also said the pistol he used was exempt from the District's handgun prohibition law because it belonged to his older son, a former FBI agent. He was accused of hypocrisy, since Rowan was a strict gun control advocate. In a 1981 column, he advocated "a law that says anyone found in possession of a handgun except a legitimate officer of the law goes to jail—period." In 1985, he called for "A complete and universal federal ban on the sale, manufacture, importation and possession of handguns (except for authorized police and military personnel).

Rowan was tried but the jury was deadlocked; the judge declared a mistrial and he was never retried. In his autobiography, Rowan said he still favors gun control, but admits being vulnerable to a charge of hypocrisy.

Bibliography

 South of Freedom (1952)
 The Pitiful and the Proud (1956)
 Go South to Sorrow (1957)
 Wait till Next Year: The Life Story of Jackie Robinson (1960)
 Just Between Us Blacks (1974)
 Breaking Barriers: A Memoir (1991)
 Growing up Black: From The Slave Days to the Present - 25 African-Americans Reveal the Trials and Triumphs of Their Childhoods (contributor, 1992)
 Dream Makers, Dream Breakers: The World of Justice Thurgood Marshall (1993)
 The Coming Race War in America: A Wake-Up Call (1996)

Notes

External links

"Carl T. Rowan", Answers.com.

1925 births
2000 deaths
American columnists
American male journalists
20th-century American memoirists
American political writers
Elijah Parish Lovejoy Award recipients
Tennessee State University alumni
Washburn University alumni
Oberlin College alumni
University of Minnesota School of Journalism and Mass Communication alumni
American gun control activists
Spingarn Medal winners
People from White County, Tennessee
Star Tribune people
The Washington Post people
Ambassadors of the United States to Finland
United States Information Agency directors
African-American diplomats
African-American journalists
20th-century American male writers
People from McMinnville, Tennessee
20th-century African-American writers